Shalanda Helen Baker (born December 24, 1976) is the current Director of the Office of Economic Impact and Diversity at the US Department of Energy in the Biden administration. She was also a professor of law, professor of public policy and urban affairs at Northeastern University.

She is the co-founder of the Initiative for Energy Justice and the author of the book Revolutionary Power: An Activist’s Guide to the Energy Transition.

Baker played in the 1998 Women's Rugby World Cup.

Education 
Baker received a Bachelor of Science degree in Political Science from the United States Air Force Academy. She received her Juris Doctor degree from Northeastern University School of Law, and later received her Master of Laws degree from University of Wisconsin Law School.

Career 
She worked as an Air Force officer during the “Don't Ask, Don't Tell” era, and pursued an honorable discharge after her personal situation put her at odds with the policy.
She was a professor of Law at the University of San Francisco and the University of Hawaii at Manoa, before joining professor of law, professor of public policy and urban affairs at Northeastern University.

Biden administration
On April 22, 2021, President Joe Biden nominated Baker to be the Director of the Office of Economic Impact and Diversity at the United States Department of Energy. Hearings were held before the Senate Energy Committee on her nomination on June 8, 2021. The committee favorably reported her nomination to the Senate floor on July 22, 2021. Baker's nomination expired at the end of the year and was returned to President Biden on January 3, 2022.

President Biden re-sent her nomination the next day. On March 8, 2022, the committee favorably reported her nomination to the Senate floor. She was confirmed by the Senate on June 7, 2022.

References

External links
 Shalanda H. Baker – U.S. Department of Energy
 H. Baker – USA Rugby

Living people
1976 births
Female rugby union players
American female rugby union players
United States women's international rugby union players
United States Air Force Academy alumni
Northeastern University School of Law alumni
University of Wisconsin Law School alumni
University of San Francisco faculty
Northeastern University faculty
University of Hawaiʻi at Mānoa faculty
American women academics
21st-century American women
Biden administration personnel